Dwarsfontein is a small settlement in Mopani District Municipality in the Limpopo province of South Africa.

References

Populated places in the Greater Tzaneen Local Municipality